University High School is a senior high school in unincorporated Monongalia County, West Virginia, near Morgantown. A part of Monongalia County Schools, it houses just over 1,250 students. It is a part of the Monongalia County Schools. Students largely come from the 2 feeder schools, Mountaineer Middle School (formerly Cheat Lake Middle School), and Westwood Middle School.

In addition to sections of Morgantown, the school serves the City of Westover.

History

Founding
The school was established by West Virginia University in September 1925 as University Demonstration High School. It was not uncommon in the south for colleges to found "demonstration schools", ostensibly as a place for students to learn educational techniques, but also because many professors were unwilling to send their children to public schools of that era.

It was originally located in the Old Tea Room on the corner of Willey and Spruce Streets. The school had 35 students and three teachers, and quickly attracted more. In 1928, strained with over two hundred students, the school was relocated to the third and fourth floors of a building on the corner of Stewart Street and University Avenue. In 1930, construction on University Demonstration High began. The school occupied the old library on the West Virginia University Campus until 1933, when the building was complete, at an estimated cost of $283,837, the school is located at the top of North Price Street.

Public
When, in 1972, West Virginia University no longer had need of the demonstration school, it was turned over to the Monongalia County Public School System. Morgantown High School district was divided and University High School was established as a second regular public high school. The school underwent major renovations and refurbishment, including the addition of a gymnasium and annex.

In 2006, construction began on a new campus for University High. This new facility, part of a bond issue passed by the citizens of Monongalia County in 2003, is located north of Morgantown along Bakers Ridge Road. The $35 million project includes a two-story classroom building, a greenhouse, a 2000-seat gymnasium, a 400-seat auxiliary gymnasium and an approximately 700 seat auditorium. In addition to the building, the campus also includes a new 4000 seat stadium for field sports, as well as multiple athletic and physical education fields. The building was designed by the award-winning Charleston WV architectural firm of Williamson Shriver Architects.

While the football team played its 2008 home games at the new high school (Mylan Pharmaceuticals Stadium), students did not arrive at the new University High until December 2008.  On Wednesday, November 19, 2008 the old school on Price Street welcomed students for the last time, and students started school at the new location on December 3, 2008. Just after a few days, the building experienced minor flooding as a result of a heating issue that activated the sprinkler system.

The building that once held University High School now houses Mountaineer Middle School, formerly Cheat Lake Middle School.

Academic Program
University High School offers 24 Advanced Placement courses, one of the largest AP programs in West Virginia.

Athletics
The University Hawks compete in the AAA class of the WVSSAC. They are members of the Two Rivers Athletic Conference (TRAC) which is a sub-conference of the Ohio Valley Athletic Conference (OVAC).
The Hawks have enjoyed a long and intense rivalry with Morgantown High School.

State Championships
Wrestling - 1956
Individual State Champion: Joe Panico
Individual State Champion: Derek Jefferson
Individual State Champion: Jesse Schiffbauer
Individual State Champion: Jon Waldron
Individual State Champion: Kyle Turnbull
Individual State Champion: David Campbell
 Individual State Champion: Luca Felix (2022)
 Individual State Champion: Brock Kehler (2022)
Boys Cross Country - 2006, 2013, 2014, 2019, 2020, 2021, 2022
Individual State Champion: Ryan Scotnicki - 2004
Individual State Champion: Seth Edwards - 2014, 2015
Individual State Champion: Philip White - 2016
Individual State Champion: Larry Edwards - 2019, 2020, 2021
Girls Cross Country - 2007, 2008, 2010, 2014, 2015, 2016, 2017, 2018
Individual State Champion: Amber Riley - 2006
Individual State Champion: Millie Paladino - 2012, 2013
Girls Soccer - 2009, 2010, 2016
Golf - 2012
Boys Lacrosse - 2011, 2013, 2014, 2015, 2017, 2018
Girls Lacrosse - 2014
Boys Basketball - 2019
Boys Track - 2022

State Runner-Up
Wrestling - 1955, 2022
Football - 1994
Girls Cross Country - 2009, 2011, 2012, 2019, 2020, 2021
Boys Cross Country - 2012, 2015
Golf - 2006
Girls Soccer - 2008, 2017
Boys Lacrosse - 2008, 2010
Girls Lacrosse - 2016
Boys Soccer - 2016, 2020
Girls Basketball - 2019

Notable alumni
 Rich Braham, '89 – Retired football center for the Cincinnati Bengals
 Sarah Culberson – Philanthropist and Mende princess
 Jedd Gyorko, '07 – Former professional baseball player for the Milwaukee Brewers
 Josh Judy, '04 – Former professional baseball player for the Cleveland Indians
 Rob Mullens, '87 – Current athletic director at the University of Oregon
 Skylar Neese – Murdered while a student in 2012.

References

External links
University High School Webpage

History of UHS

Public high schools in West Virginia
Buildings and structures in Morgantown, West Virginia
Educational institutions established in 1925
Schools in Monongalia County, West Virginia